"Postcards" is a song recorded by British singer-songwriter James Blunt. It was released on 19 May 2014, as the third single from his fourth studio album Moon Landing (2013). The song was written by James Blunt, Wayne Hector, Steve Robson and produced by Martin Terefe.

Track listing

Charts

Release history

References

2014 singles
2014 songs
James Blunt songs
Songs written by James Blunt
Atlantic Records singles